SS Stephen Smith was a Liberty ship built in the United States during World War II. She was named after Stephen Smith.

Construction 
Stephen Smith was laid down on 26 September 1944, under a Maritime Commission (MARCOM) contract, MC hull 2326, by J.A. Jones Construction, Panama City, Florida; sponsored by Mrs. Edward Overcash, wife of superintendent marine and electrical facilities, and launched on 31 October 1944.

History
She was allocated to American West African Line Inc., 13 November 1944. On 7 May 1946, she was laid up in the James River Reserve Fleet, Lee Hall, Virginia. On 26 February 1948, she was placed in the National Defense Reserve Fleet, in Wilmington, North Carolina.

She was sold for scrapping, 19 February 1960, to Bethlehem Steel, for $70,161. She was withdrawn from the fleet, 28 March 1960.

References

Bibliography 

 
 
 
 

 

Liberty ships
Ships built in Panama City, Florida
1944 ships
James River Reserve Fleet
Wilmington Reserve Fleet